The Bieberer Berg is a hill in Offenbach in the German state of Hesse. The hill is well known in Germany because the local stadium that is the home ground of Kickers Offenbach. The hill area also contains a water tower and  park with a ropes course.
 

Hills of Hesse